Carney is an unincorporated community and census-designated place in Baltimore County, Maryland, United States. The population was 29,941 at the 2010 census.

Geography
Carney is located at  (39.396707, −76.524078).

Demographics

As of the census of 2000, there were 28,264 people, 12,083 households, and 7,322 families living in the CDP. The population density was 4,042.7 people per square mile (1,561.2 per km2). There were 12,477 housing units at an average density of 1,784.6 per square mile (689.2 per km2). The racial makeup of the CDP was 85.31% White, 6.92% African American, 0.17% Native American, 5.74% Asian, 0.06% Pacific Islander, 0.43% from other races, and 1.37% from two or more races. Hispanic or Latino of any race were 1.51% of the population.

There were 12,083 households, out of which 27.1% had children under the age of 18 living with them, 46.2% were married couples living together, 10.6% had a female householder with no husband present, and 39.4% were non-families. 32.4% of all households were made up of individuals, and 15.0% had someone living alone who was 65 years of age or older. The average household size was 2.28 and the average family size was 2.91.

In the CDP, the population was spread out, with 22.0% under the age of 18, 8.2% from 18 to 24, 29.4% from 25 to 44, 21.0% from 45 to 64, and 19.4% who were 65 years of age or older. The median age was 39 years. For every 100 females, there were 89.5 males. For every 100 females age 18 and over, there were 84.3 males.

The median income for a household in the CDP was $49,365, and the median income for a family was $57,079. Males had a median income of $40,265 versus $31,914 for females. The per capita income for the CDP was $24,428. About 2.8% of families and 5.4% of the population were below the poverty line, including 5.2% of those under age 18 and 7.5% of those age 65 or over.

History

In 1880, Thomas Carney immigrated to the United States from Ireland and settled in Texas, Maryland. Soon after his arrival, he married the former Mary McDermot and bought forty and one-half acres on the southeast side of the Baltimore and Harford Turnpike.

Several years later (circa 1885), the Carney family moved to what is now Harford and Joppa roads, where Thomas Carney opened a general store which is believed to have served as the Eight Mile House on the turnpike. The store was located on the site presently occupied by the Das Bierhalle Restaurant. In the 1880s and 1890s, the store also served as the Carney family home.

When the family grew too large for the store, Mr. Carney built a new house on the hill behind the store. The house was completed in approximately 1898 and stood in the vicinity of what is now Thornewood Court. Thirty-five years later, the Carney house was moved to its present location at the corner of Joppa and Avondale roads and is now a real estate office.

With the passage of time and the suburban growth of Baltimore County, the land once owned by the Carney family has been sold to individuals and developers. However, the Carney family name is now carried by area businesses and clubs. Two institutions, the Carney Library and the Carney Elementary School, also carry the name. Little did Thomas Carney, an industrious Irish immigrant, realize that his memory would live on by a community which bears his name.

Hamburger Junction was a legendary train-themed restaurant in Carney, Maryland at the intersection of Harford & Joppa Roads. The restaurant opened in 1956 and closed in 1965. The owner, Natt Begun, combined his love of trains with his innate creativity. The result was a train-themed dining experience that included entrees delivered onboard a model electric train. He endeared himself to local kids with an array of creative sundaes, and by giving free ice cream to any child who presented a good report card. Mr. Begun knew his market. He offered dine-in, carry-out, and car service with car hops. Something of a renaissance man, before coming to Baltimore Mr. Begun pioneered the food truck concept in his native New York. Relying on his World War II experience, he converted a surplus army bus into the Sad Sack food truck. He then parked it outside the employment office in New York, a busy location in the years immediately following the war! But the handwriting was on the wall. Fast-food franchises were appearing, the market was shifting, and the land under the restaurant had increased in value as the community grew. So due to both business and family reasons, Mr. Begun knew when to pull the plug. Hamburger Junction is now just a memory, a fond memory to many.

The Great Carney Fire of 1911 was started by two boys playing with matches in a weed patch behind Carney’s Hotel (now Das Bierhalle) on Harford Road. When it was finally extinguished 700 acres had burned. The burned over area was located between Harford, Joppa, Belair, and Putty Hill Roads. Fire Companies from Gardenville, Parkville, Hamilton, Towson, and Roland Park responded. The Carney and Snyder homes narrowly survived and are still standing today. Given that this conflagration occurred in 1911, it’s safe to assume at least some of the firefighters were veterans of the Great Baltimore Fire of 1904. Thankfully, no one was killed, and the only injury reported was a firefighter who sustained a sprained ankle.

Education
Carney is served by Carney Elementary School, Harford Hills Elementary School, and Pine Grove Elementary School, Pine Grove Middle School, Loch Raven High School, and Parkville High School

Transportation

Roads
Some of the major roads in the Carney area are:
Joppa Road
Harford Road (MD-147)
Old Harford Road

Public transportation
The Maryland Transit Administration's Bus Route 54 operates along Harford Road between the Carney Park-and-Ride and Downtown Baltimore.

References

External links

 Carney Improvement Association

Census-designated places in Maryland
Census-designated places in Baltimore County, Maryland